Pari intervallo is a composition by Estonian composer Arvo Pärt, written in 1976 in four parts without fixed instrumentation. The composer later made versions for organ (1980), four recorders (1980), clarinet, trombone and string orchestra (1995), saxophone quartet (2002), two pianos or piano duet (2008), and eight or four cellos (2010). Pari intervallo was one of seven works premiered in 1976 under the title tintinnabuli, the name of compositional style created by the composer.

Structure
The work is in one movement and is approximately 6 minutes. It is in E-flat minor and consists of four voices; first and third playing only notes from E-flat minor chord and second and fourth (pedal bass) playing melody in parallel thirds (2 octaves apart).

Organ stops
Notated organ stops in the score:
Manual:  (soft) 8′ (ev. Quintaton 8′, ev. + Trem.)
Pedal: 16′ (8′),  (coupled)

References

https://www.universaledition.com/sheet-music-and-more/Pari-intervallo-fuer-Orgel-Paert-Arvo-UE36995
http://www.allmusic.com/composition/pari-intervallo-for-organ-mc0002370977

See also
List of compositions by Arvo Pärt

1976 compositions
Compositions by Arvo Pärt
Compositions in E-flat minor